is a group of three Japanese photographers and their associates who worked together on exhibitions and books from 1992 until 2009 or a little later.

History and concept
In 1992, the artist, novelist and old-camera enthusiast Genpei Akasegawa, the artist Yūtokutaishi Akiyama, and the photographer Yutaka Takanashi met at the opening party of an exhibition by the singer Anri Sugano and found that they had happened to bring along a Leica M3, M2 and M4 respectively. They found that they shared an enjoyment of mechanical cameras and also enjoyed walking around the streets taking photographs together. From that time until 2009 or thereabouts they walked around Nagoya, Hakata, Paris, Mie, and Tokyo; and exhibited and published the results.

Planned in early 2009 were photographs of Kurashiki (Okayama).

The three said that they hoped their photography would preserve the individuality of the photographer, and that it would appeal not just to enthusiasts of Leica and other mechanical cameras but rather to all.

Akasegawa published an essay, "Raika Dōmei", about the group.

The three had no rigid allegiance to the Leica brand, or even avoidance of electronics: each photograph in the book Tokyo Kaleidoscope, for example, is annotated with a mention of the camera and lens used; the photographs by Akasegawa use a variety of cameras (including the Contax G2), and many of those by Takanashi use a Hexar RF.

Exhibitions
All the exhibitions listed here were by the three photographers as a group.
"Raika Dōmei happyōkai". Bokushin Garō (Tokyo), 1994.
"Nagoya o toru"　(). Art Gallery C-Square, Chukyo University (Nagoya), June–July 1996.
"Honchō yorigasumi". Konica Plaza (Tokyo), 1996.
"Sanjūshi. Art Gallery C-Square, Chukyo University (Nagoya),　June–July 1998.
"Kyū-Kyōbashi-ku Raika-chō-ten"　(). Inax Gallery 2 (Kyōbashi, Tokyo), January 1999.
"Pari kaihō". Art Gallery C-Square, Chukyo University (Nagoya), April 2000.
"Hakata raishū". Mitsubishi Jisho Artium (Fukuoka), February–March 2001.
"Tōkyō kareidosukōpu". Art Gallery C-Square, Chukyo University (Nagoya),　September–October 2002.
"Ra-haikai Tōkyō-hen". Library gallery, Musashino Art University (Kodaira, Tokyo), June–July 2003.
"Ra-haikai etosetora". Art Gallery C-Square, Chukyo University (Nagoya), October–November 2004.
"Endoresu Nagoya". Art Gallery C-Square, Chukyo University (Nagoya),　September–October 2006.
"Hakata yamamori". Gallery-58 (Ginza, Tokyo), March 2007.

Akasegawa's essay

Katsuhiko Otsuji (i.e. Genpei Akasegawa). Raika Dōmei. Tokyo: Kōdansha, 1994. .  The title piece of what's billed as a collection of shōsetsu (stories) is about the Dōmei.
Genpei Akasegawa. Raika Dōmei. Chikuma Bunko. Tokyo: Chikuma Shobō, 1999. .  A bunkobon reprint, this time attributed to the author's better known pseudonym.

Books by the Dōmei
All the books listed below are by the three photographers as a group.

Raika Dōmei: Nagoya shageki!. Nagoya: Fūbaisha, 1996. .  Photographs of Nagoya.
Raika Dōmei: Pari kaihō. Tokyo: Alpha-beta, 2001. .  Photographs of Paris.
Tōkyō kareidosukōpu: Raika Dōmei / Tokyo Kaleidoscope. Tokyo: Alpha-beta, 2002. .  Photographs of Tokyo.

Notes

References

External links
Raika Dōmei, the official website, as archived by the Wayback Machine on 28 December 2009 

1992 establishments in Japan
Cooperatives in Japan
Japanese photography organizations